PV Puram, also known as Prasanna Venkateswara Puram is a village located in Tirupati district, Andhra Pradesh, India. It is a small village of around 120 houses with a population of 500.

References

   Google Maps

Villages in Tirupati district